Habroteleia ruficoxa, is a species of wasp belonging to the family Platygastridae. It is found in Philippines.

Description
Body length of male is 4.00 mm. Mesosoma and metasoma are black. Antennae scrobe is foveate. Central keel present.

References

Insects described in 1916
Scelioninae